Isabella (27 January 1216/ 25 January 1217 – 23 January 1252), also Isabel or Zabel, was queen regnant of Armenian Cilicia from 1219 until her death in 1252.

She was proclaimed queen under the regency of Adam of Baghras. After he was assassinated, Constantine of Baberon (of the Hethumid family) was nominated as guardian. At this juncture, Raymond-Roupen, grandson of Roupen III (the elder brother of Isabella’s father, King Leo I), attempted to claim to throne of Cilicia for himself, but he was defeated, captured, and executed.

Constantine of Baberon was soon convinced to seek an alliance with Prince Bohemond IV of Antioch, and he arranged a marriage between the young princess and Philip, a son of Bohemond IV. Philip, however, offended the Armenians’ sensibilities, and even despoiled the royal palace, sending the royal crown to Antioch; therefore, he was confined in a prison in Sis (now Kozan in Turkey), where he died, presumably poisoned.

The unhappy young Isabella was forced to marry Constantine of Barbaron’s son, Hethum. Although for many years she refused to live with him, in the end she relented. The apparent unification in marriage of the two principal dynastic forces of Cilicia (the Roupenids and the Hethumids) ended a century of dynastic and territorial rivalry and brought the Hethumids to the forefront of political dominance in Cilician Armenia.

Early years
Isabella was the only child of King Leo I by his second wife, Sybilla of Cyprus.  She was betrothed to Andrew, the third son of King Andrew II of Hungary in 1218, but the betrothal was later broken in favor of a more advantageous Russian marriage for her bridegroom.

King Leo I died on May, 1219. On his death-bed, he named Isabella as his heir; and released the barons from their oath of allegiance to his great-nephew, Raymond-Roupen. But the claim of his five-year-old daughter was contested by Raymond-Roupen and by John of Brienne.

Isabella emerged as the favourite of the ruling Armenian nobles and thus she was proclaimed queen by acclamation and placed under the regency of Adam of Baghras. But Adam of Baghras was murdered after a few months; and the regency passed to the only remaining influential Armenian house, that of the Hethumian family whose head was Constantine of Barbaron.

John of Brienne’s claim was based on his marriage to Leo I’s older daughter Rita (Stephanie). Pope Honorius III recognized John of Brienne’s claim that his wife or her son should succeed. John of Brienne received the Pope’s permission to leave the Crusade and visit Cilician Armenia in February, 1220. But as he prepared to sail for Cilicia his Armenian wife died; and when their small son died a few weeks later, John of Brienne had no further claim on the Armenian throne.

Raymond-Roupen laid claim to the throne by virtue of lineage through his mother Alice, the niece of King Leo I. Moreover, he had long been considered as King Leo I’s heir. Raymond-Roupen approached the crusaders at Damietta in 1219 for support in claiming Cilician Armenia, and was able to return in 1221 with some of them and promises from the Papal legate Pelagius. Raymond-Roupen found some Armenian support in and around Tarsus, notably Vahram, the castellan of Corycus. Together they conquered from Tarsus to Adana, but then met reverses and were forced to retire to Tarsus where Raymond-Roupen was captured and ended his days in prison in 1222; his infant daughters retired with their mother to Cyprus. This event left Isabella the sole and largely incontestable heir to her father’s throne.

Wife of Philip of Antioch
Cilician Armenia, weakened by wars and in need of strong ally, found a temporary solution in a tie with the Principality of Antioch: the regent suggested that Prince Bohemond IV should send his fourth son, Philip, to marry Isabella, insisting only that the bridegroom should join the separated Armenian Church. Philip agreed to adopt the Armenian faith, communion and customs and to respect the privileges of all nations in Cilician Armenia.

Philip married Isabella at Sis in June 1222 and was accepted as king. The joint rule of Isabella and Philip was brief; Philip’s disdain for the Armenian ritual, which he had promised to respect, and his marked favoritism to the Latin barons angered the Armenian nobility. Philip spent as much time as possible in Antioch.

When it was rumored that Philip wanted to give the crown and throne to Antioch, Constantine of Barbaron led a revolt at the end of 1224. Philip and Isabella were seized at Tall Hamdun (today Toprakkale in Turkey) on their way to Antioch and taken back to Sis, where Philip was imprisoned and probably poisoned at the beginning of 1225.

On the death of her husband, Isabella decided to embrace monastic life and fled to Silifke Castle. She sought refuge with the Hospitallers. The latter were unwilling to give her up to Constantine of Barbaron, but feared the powerful regent; they eased their conscience by selling him the fortress with Isabella in it.

Bohemond IV, in anger, was determined on war, although such a conflict had been expressly forbidden by the pope as harmful for all Christendom. Bohemond IV called in as ally the sultan at Iconium, Kai-Qobad I, and ravaged upper Cilicia in 1225. Constantine of Barbaron arranged for the regent of Aleppo, Toghril, to advance on Antioch. When the latter attacked Baghras, Bohemond IV had to return to his own lands.

Wife of Hethum of Barbaron

Isabella was forced into marriage with Constantine of Barbaron’s son who was subsequently crowned King Hetum I in Tarsus in June 1226. She is said to have refused to consummate the marriage for several years.

Constantine of Barbaron now thought it wise to reconcile Armenia with the Papacy: loyal messengers were sent in the name of the young couple to the Pope and to the Emperor Frederick II. Although Bohemond IV and later his son, Bohemond V attempted to persuade the Pope to arrange a divorce between Isabella and Hethum, but both he and King Henry I of Cyprus were specifically forbidden by Rome to attack the Armenians.  The marriage was legalized by Rome in 1237.

There is evidence that Isabella shared a degree of royal power, for we learn from several sources that she co-signed with her husband an official deed transferring to the Knights of the Teutonic Order the strategic castle and town of Haronie.

She was buried in the monastery of Trazarg.

Marriages and children
# (1)  25 January 1221 – 24 January 1222: Philip of Antioch (? – Sis, 1225/1226)

# (2)  14 May 1226: Hethum I, king of Cilician Armenia (1215 –  28 October 1270)
Euphemia (? – 1309), the wife of Julian of Sidon (? –  12 January 1275/ 11 January 1276)
Sybilla (? – 1290), the wife of Prince Bohemond VI of Antioch (c. 1237 – May/ 11 July 1275)
Rita (? – ?), the wife of Constantine of Servantikar
Leo II, king of Cilician Armenia ( 24 January 1236/ 23 January 1237 –  6 February 1289)
Thoros (1244 –  24 August 1266)
Isabella (? – c. 1268)
Marie, who married Guy of Ibelin, son of Baldwin of Ibelin, Seneschal of Cyprus.

Ancestors

Footnotes

Sources

Edwards, Robert W.: The Fortifications of Armenian Cilicia: Dumbarton Oaks Studies XXIII; Dumbarton Oaks, Trustees for Harvard University, 1987, Washington, D.C.; 
Engel, Pál (Author) – Pálosfalvi, Tamás (Translator): The Realm of St Stephen: A History of Medieval Hungary, 895–1526; I.B. Tauris, 2005, London and New York; 
Ghazarian, Jacob G: The Armenian Kingdom in Cilicia during the Crusades: The Integration of Cilician Armenians with the Latins (1080–1393); Routledge Curzon (Taylor & Francis Group), 2000, Abingdon; 

 

 

1210s births
1252 deaths
Armenian people of Cypriot descent
Queens regnant in Asia
Hethumid dynasty
13th-century women rulers
Year of birth unknown
Monarchs of the Rubenid dynasty
Armenian princesses
13th-century Armenian people
13th-century Armenian women